Dudullu Spor Women's Football is a women's football team based at Yukarı Dudullu neighborhood of Ümraniye district in Istanbul Province, Turkey playing in the Turkish Women's First Football League. It was formed in 2014 as part of the 1985-established Dudullu Football Club. The club's current chairman is Ali Yazlı. The team was promoted from the Women's Second League after the 2019–20 season. to the First League, which was renamed in the 2021–22 season to Super League

History 
Dudullu women's football team were formed in 2014, and admitted to the newly established Women's Third League playing in the 2014–15 season in the Group 1. They became group third in the 2015–16 season, and group leader in the following three seasons in a row. Following the 2018–19 season, the team were promoted to the Women's Second League. They were promuted to the Women's First League for the 2020–21 season according to point average by decision of the Turkish Football Federation (TFF) as the season could not be completed due to the outbreak of the COVID-19 pandemic in Turkey. Dudullu was promoted to 1st Division and was one of the founding teams of Turkish Women Superleague in 2021-22 season.

Stadium 
The team play home matches at Dudullu Stadium in Yukarı Dudullu, Ümraniye. 
Built in 1985, it has a seating capacity for 200 spectators. The ground is artificial turf and has floodlights for night games.

Statistics 
.

(1): Promoted after the incomplete season by TFF decision according to point average
(2): Remained in the Super League after play-outs
(3): Season in progress

Current squad 

Head coach:  Ekrem Taslak

Kit history

Squad history

References 

Association football clubs established in 1985
1985 establishments in Turkey
2014 establishments in Turkey
Football clubs in Istanbul
Sport in Ümraniye
Women's football clubs in Turkey